This is a list of events that happened in 2004 in Mexico.

Incumbents

Federal government
 President: Vicente Fox 

 Interior Secretary (SEGOB): Santiago Creel
 Secretary of Foreign Affairs (SRE): Luis Ernesto Derbez
 Communications Secretary (SCT): Pedro Cerisola
 Education Secretary (SEP): Reyes Tamez
 Secretary of Defense (SEDENA): Gerardo Clemente Vega
 Secretary of Navy (SEMAR): Marco Antonio Peyrot González
 Secretary of Labor and Social Welfare (STPS): José Carlos María Abascal Carranza
 Secretary of Welfare (SEDESOL): Josefina Vázquez Mota
 Tourism Secretary (SECTUR): Rodolfo Elizondo Torres
 Secretary of the Environment (SEMARNAT): Alberto Cárdenas
 Secretary of Health (SALUD): Julio Frenk
Attorney General of Mexico (PRG): Rafael Macedo de la Concha

Supreme Court

 President of the Supreme Court: Mariano Azuela Güitrón

Governors

 Aguascalientes
Felipe González González , until August 25
Juan José León Rubio, Interim governor, August 25–November 30
Luis Armando Reynoso , starting December 1
 Baja California: Eugenio Elorduy Walther 
Baja California Sur: Leonel Cota Montaño  
 Campeche: Jorge Carlos Hurtado Valdez 
 Chiapas: Pablo Salazar Mendiguchía 
 Chihuahua
Patricio Martínez García , until October 3
José Reyes Baeza Terrazas , starting October 4
 Coahuila: Enrique Martínez y Martínez 
 Colima: Gustavo Vázquez Montes , starting January 1
 Durango
Ángel Sergio Guerrero Mier , until September 14
Ismael Hernández , starting September 15
 Guanajuato: Juan Carlos Romero Hicks 
 Guerrero: René Juárez Cisneros 
 Hidalgo: Manuel Ángel Núñez Soto 
 Jalisco: Alberto Cárdenas 
 State of Mexico: Arturo Montiel 
 Michoacán: Lázaro Cárdenas Batel 
 Morelos: Sergio Estrada Cajigal Ramírez 
 Nayarit: Antonio Echevarría Domínguez
 Nuevo León: Fernando Canales Clariond 
 Oaxaca
José Murat Casab , until November 30
Ulises Ruiz Ortiz , starting December 1
 Puebla: Melquíades Morales 
 Querétaro
Ignacio Loyola Vera , until September 30
Francisco Garrido Patrón , starting October 1
 Quintana Roo: Joaquín Hendricks Díaz 
 San Luis Potosí
Fernando Silva Nieto, until September 25
Jesús Marcelo de los Santos , starting September 26
 Sinaloa: Juan S. Millán , until December 31
 Sonora: Eduardo Bours 
 Tabasco: Manuel Andrade Díaz , starting January 1
 Tamaulipas: Tomás Yarrington 	
 Tlaxcala: Alfonso Sánchez Anaya 
 Veracruz
Miguel Alemán Velasco , until November 30
Fidel Herrera Beltrán , starting December 1
 Yucatán: Víctor Cervera Pacheco 
 Zacatecas
Ricardo Monreal , until September 11
Amalia García , starting September 12
Head of Government of the Federal District: Andrés Manuel López Obrador

Events

 Videoscandals 
 The Desafuero of Manuel López Obrador 
 The Vallarta Botanical Gardens are founded. 
 The new Museo Estatal de Arte Popular de Oaxaca gets inaugurated. 
 The National Institute of Genomic Medicine INMEGEN is founded. 
 January 12–13: Monterrey Special Summit of the Americas 
 March 30: Ariel Award ceremony at the Palacio de Bellas Artes. 
 April 30: the Avena case is decided. 
 May 13: 2004 Mexican UFO incident 
 May 23: The Comando Jaramillista Morelense 23 de Mayo bomb 3 banks in Cuernavaca, Morelos, 
 September 10–20: Hurricane Javier (2004) 
 September 11: Nuestra Belleza México 2004
 December 26: 3 Mexicans are among the victims of the 2004 Indian Ocean tsunami.

Elections

 2004 Chihuahua state election
 2004 Durango state election
 2004 Oaxaca state election
 2004 Zacatecas state election

Awards

	
Belisario Domínguez Medal of Honor	- Carlos Canseco González
Order of the Aztec Eagle	
National Prize for Arts and Sciences	
National Public Administration Prize	
Ohtli Award
 Nancy "Rusty" Barceló
 Bob Menedez

Sport

 Primera División de México Clausura 2004
 Primera División de México Apertura 2004 
 2004 InterLiga 
 2004 Desafío Corona season 
 2004 Gran Premio Telmex/Tecate 
 Homenaje a Dos Leyendas: El Santo y Salvador Lutteroth (2004) 
 Mexico at the 2004 Summer Olympics 
 Mexico at the 2004 Summer Paralympics 
 2004 World Karate Championships in Monterrey, Nuevo Leon
 2004 Mexican Figure Skating Championships 
 2004 Women's Pan-American Volleyball Cup in Mexicali and Tijuana, Baja California. 
 1st AIBA American 2004 Olympic Qualifying Tournament in Tijuana. 
 2004 Central American and Caribbean Junior Championships in Athletics in Coatzacoalcos
 The Bravos de Nuevo Laredo, Búhos de Hermosillo, Vaqueros de Ixtlan CF and the Azucareros de Tezonapa are founded.

Deaths

 February 17 – José López Portillo, 51st President of Mexico 1976-1982 (b. 1920)
August 18 — Víctor Cervera Pacheco, politician (PRI); Governor of Yucatán 1984–1988 and 1995–2001 (b. 1936)

References

 
Years of the 21st century in Mexico
Mexico